Eupristocerus cogitans is a species of beetles in the family Buprestidae, the only species in the genus Eupristocerus.

References

Monotypic Buprestidae genera